William Nesbit may refer to:

 William Nesbit (thief) (1899–1983), American jewel thief who briefly escaped prison and was on the FBI's most wanted list
 William Nesbit (activist) (1822–1895), African-American civil rights leader

See also
 William Nesbitt (disambiguation)
William Nisbet (disambiguation)